Try Me! is the second studio album by James Brown and the Famous Flames. It is a collection of singles, B-sides, and outtakes from their first album, Please Please Please. It was reissued by King Records in 1964 under the title The Unbeatable James Brown: 16 Hits.

Track listing
All tracks composed by James Brown; except where indicated

References

James Brown albums
1959 albums
King Records (United States) albums
The Famous Flames albums